The Men's 50 Butterfly at the 10th FINA World Swimming Championships (25m) was swum 17–18 December 2010 in Dubai, United Arab Emirates. On 17 December 119 individuals swam in the Preliminary heats in the morning, with the top-16 finishers advancing to swim again in the Semifinals that evening. The top-8 from the Semifinals then advanced to swim the Final the next evening.

At the start of the event, the existing World (WR) and Championship records (CR) were:

The following records were established during the competition:

Results

Heats

Semifinals
Semifinal 1

Semifinal 2

Final

References

Butterfly 050 metre, Men's
World Short Course Swimming Championships